The Guardians is a television political thriller series of 13 60-minute episodes made by London Weekend Television and broadcast in the UK on the ITV network (with the exception of Ulster Television) between 10 July 1971 and 2 October 1971.

Synopsis
The Guardians is a dystopian political thriller set in the 1980s. Following economic chaos, democratic government has been overthrown in a bloodless coup, the Royal Family fled into self-imposed exile and the United Kingdom is ruled autocratically by Prime Minister Sir Timothy Hobson. Hobson is initially a pawn of 'the General'; a military officer by the name of Roger, who later becomes the Minister of Defence. Hobson subscribes to an outwardly benevolent paternalistic fascism, based on the principle that "democracy is a form of group suicide." Political opposition is suppressed by a uniformed paramilitary force recruited from former policemen, soldiers and security guards and called "The Guardians of the Realm" (known for short as "The Guardians" or simply "The Gs"). Each episode begins with a column of Guardians marching through central London to a memorable theme tune composed by Wilfred Josephs.

The government, nominally headed by Hobson, is opposed by a fragmented resistance movement collectively named "Quarmby." The dominant group within Quarmby favours a strategy of provoking increased oppression by the state through the use of assassination and other forms of terrorism. The series avoided black and white scenarios by portraying moderate and extreme factions jostling within both government and resistance. Hobson represents the liberal element within government, attempting to outmanoeuvre the seldom-seen General and the polished Cabinet Secretary Norman.

Cast

Episode list

Northern Ireland
The Independent Television Authority decided that the series was unsuitable to be broadcast in Northern Ireland due to IRA activity there because of its political content such as depictions of terrorist activity from the terrorist's point of view.

DVD release
The Guardians was released on DVD in the UK on 1 February 2010 by Network. The full 13-part series was released as a 4-disc set.

References

External links

The Guardians at Screen Online
National Science and Media Museum (Bradford)
The Guardians at OldFutures

1970s British drama television series
1971 British television series debuts
1971 British television series endings
ITV television dramas
British science fiction television shows
Dystopian television series
Television series by ITV Studios
London Weekend Television shows
English-language television shows
1970s British science fiction television series
Television series set in the 1980s
Television series set in the future